Rıfat Ilgaz (7 May 1911 – 7 July 1993) was a Turkish teacher, writer and poet.

Biography
He was born in Cide, in the Kastamonu Vilayet of the Ottoman Empire (present-day Turkey). Ilgaz was one of Turkey’s best-known and most prolific poets and writers, having authored over sixty works. Ilgaz started writing poetry during his junior school years and evolved into one of the prolific social-realist writers of the 20th-century Turkish literature. His poems are considered prime examples of socialist-realistic writing. While he has never really been a partisan of political ideologies, the fact that he has written about the sufferings of the people placed him at a left wing perspective. Like other writers of his time, Ilgaz was imprisoned as a result of one of his publications.

In addition to his writing, he led an accomplished career as a lecturer in Turkish literature. In 1946 he founded a leading satirical weekly magazine, Marko Paşa, with Aziz Nesin and Sabahattin Ali.

Rıfat Ilgaz died in Istanbul on 7 July 1993 due to lung failure. He was buried at Zincirlikuyu Cemetery.

English language bibliography 
One collection of Ilgaz's short stories has been published in English translation.

Fourth Company 
A 2001 short story collection by Turkish writer Rifat Ilgaz published by Milet Books, in dual Turkish and English translation by Damian Croft, as part of its series of Turkish-English Short Story Collections.

The publisher states that, “In the deftly comic six-part story, Fourth Company and two further stories, Rifat Ilgaz turns his sharp but affectionate wit on compulsory military service, holidays at home and the pathological fear of doctors.”

The volume consists of the stories;
Fourth Company (Parts 1–6)
Off to Exchange Bayram Greetings
A Fear of Doctors

Editions

Selected works
 Apartıman Çocukları
 Bacaksız Okulda
 Bacaksız Plajda
 Cart Curt
 Çalış Osman Çiftlik Senin
 Devam
 Don Kişot Istanbul'da
 Garibin Horozu
 Geçmişe Mazi
 Güvercinim Uyur mu?
 Hababam Sınıfı (1975) (made into a movie)
 Hababam Sınıfı Sınıfta Kaldı (1975) (made into a movie)
 Hababam Sınıfı Baskında (made into a movie)
 Hababam Sınıfı İcraatın İçinde
 Hababam Sınıfı Uyanıyor
 Hoca Nasrettin Ve Çömezleri
 Karadeniz'in Kıyıcığında
 Karartma Geceleri (1990) (made into a movie)
 Kırk Yıl Once Kırk Yıl Sonra
 Kulağımız Kirişte
 Nerde Kalmıştık
 Nerde O Eski Usturalar
 Ocak Katırı Alagöz
 Öksüz Civciv
 Pijamalılar
 Radarın Anahtarı
 Rüşvetin Alamancası
 Sarı Yazma
 Sınıf
 Soluk Soluğa/Karakılçık/Uzak Değil
 Sosyal Kadınlar Partisi
 Şeker Kutusu
 Üsküdar'da Sabah Oldu
 Yarenlik
 Yaşadıkça
 Yıldız Karayel
 Yokuş Yukarı
 Halime Kaptan

See also
 List of contemporary Turkish poets

References

1911 births

People from Cide
People from Kastamonu vilayet
Gazi Eğitim Enstitüsü alumni
Turkish schoolteachers
Turkish male writers
Turkish novelists
Turkish male poets
Turkish prisoners and detainees
Prisoners and detainees of Turkey
20th-century novelists
20th-century poets
Turkish Marxists
1993 deaths
Burials at Zincirlikuyu Cemetery
Turkish magazine founders